Sekanyonyi, is a settlement in Mityana District, in the Central Region of Uganda.

Location
The coordinates of Sekanyoni are 0°30'07.0"N, 32°08'19.0"E (Latitude:0.501951; Longitude:32.138608).

Overview
The Mityana–Sekanyonyi–Busunju Road passes through the middle of town.

See also
 Mityana–Sekanyonyi–Busunju Road

References

External links
 Rural Communications Development Fund (RCDF): RCDF Projects In Mityana District, Uganda
  Website of Mityana District Local Government

Populated places in Central Region, Uganda
Cities in the Great Rift Valley
Mityana District